The 2013 Quebec Scotties Tournament of Hearts was held from January 22 to 27 at the Centre sportif Victoriaville in Victoriaville, Quebec. The winning team will represent Quebec at the 2013 Scotties Tournament of Hearts in Kingston, Ontario,

Qualification

Teams
The teams are listed as follows:

Round-robin standings
Final round-robin standings

Round-robin results
All draw times are listed in Eastern Standard Time (UTC−5).

Draw 1
Tuesday, January 22, 12:00

Draw 2
Tuesday, January 22, 19:30

Draw 3
Wednesday, January 23, 12:00

Draw 4
Wednesday, January 23, 19:30

Draw 5
Thursday, January 24, 8:15

Draw 6
Thursday, January 24, 15:45

Draw 7
Friday, January 25, 14:15

Tiebreakers
Saturday, January 26, 14:00

Saturday, January 26, 19:00

Playoffs

Semifinals
Sunday, January 27, 9:00

Final
Sunday, January 27, 14:00

References

Quebec
Quebec
Sport in Victoriaville
Curling in Quebec
Scotties Tournament of Hearts
Quebec Scotties Tournament of Hearts